Barisha Sashibhusan Janakalyan Vidyapith, also known as BSJV,  is a government-sponsored higher secondary school in the state of West Bengal, India. The school offers education in Bengali medium with English as the second language. Other subjects are taught as per the norms of the  West Bengal Board of Secondary Education, the West Bengal Council of Higher Secondary Education. In 2020, the school won 'Aajkaal Pushpanjali Samman Sera School' award for Saraswati Puja.
In 2020, a student of Barisha Shashibhushan Janakalyan Vidyapith, wrote the English examination from the male ward of the Calcutta National Medical College Hospital as he had to be admitted to the hospital with severe anaemia.

References 

1968 establishments in West Bengal
Educational institutions established in 1968
High schools and secondary schools in Kolkata